The province of Ontario, Canada, has professional sports teams in a wide variety of sports:

Active teams

Ice hockey

Basketball

NBA G League
Raptors 905

National Basketball League of Canada
KW Titans
London Lightning
Sudbury Five
Windsor Express

Baseball

Frontier League
Ottawa Titans

Canadian football

Lacrosse

Soccer

Former teams

Ice hockey 
National Hockey League
Hamilton Tigers (became New York Americans)
Ottawa Senators - first Ontario team to win Stanley Cup (became St. Louis Eagles for final season)

National Hockey Association
 Haileybury Comets
 Renfrew Millionaires
 Toronto Blueshirts - first Toronto team to win Stanley Cup

Canadian Professional Hockey League
 Hamilton Tigers
 London Panthers
 Toronto Ravinas

American Hockey League
Cornwall Aces
Hamilton Canucks
Hamilton Bulldogs
Newmarket Saints
St. Catharines Saints
Toronto Roadrunners

World Hockey Association
Ottawa Civics
Toronto Toros

ECHL
Brampton Beast

Canadian Women's Hockey League
Markham Thunder
Toronto Furies

Basketball 
Basketball Association of America
Toronto Huskies

World Basketball League
Hamilton Skyhawks

Baseball 
International League
Ottawa Lynx
Toronto Maple Leafs

Canadian football 
Canadian Football League
Ottawa Renegades
Ottawa Rough Riders

Arena football 
Arena Football League
Toronto Phantoms

Soccer 
USL Premier Development League
Toronto Lynx (dropped from professional status to the PDL in 2007)

USL Championship
Ottawa Fury FC

Rugby 
Super League
Toronto Wolfpack

See also 
Professional sports in Canada
List of professional sports teams in Canada by city

References 

Ontario
 
Teams